María del Rosario Graciela Rayas Trejo (1943 – 21 August 2014), known professionally as Tehua ("you" in Nahuatl), was a Mexican singer and popularizer of traditional music. She was named by the poet Jaime Sabines as the "abusive voice of birds."

Biography
When she was two years old, Tehua's family emigrated from Querétaro City to San Miguel de Allende, Guanajuato, of which she considers herself a native. At age 26 she moved to Mexico City to begin her career as a singer. According to her own admissions, her intention was to have a style similar to that of Lucha Villa. However, the difference in their voices made it impossible to continue in that direction. She began to sing in bars.

In the early 1970s she began to sing protest songs. In that environment she met Óscar Chávez and Amparo Ochoa, with whom she collaborated on multiple occasions.

Among Tehua's repertoire were old Mexican songs from different parts of the country, from Sonora to Oaxaca and Chiapas. She has interpreted songs by composers such as Joaquín Pardavé, Agustín Lara, Ignacio Fernández Esperón (Tata Nacho), and Salvador Chava Flores. She has rescued songs such as "Mis blancas mariposas", "La norteña", "El buque de más potencia", "Cuatro milpas", "Mi casita de paja", and "El jarabe loco", which were in danger of being forgotten.

Her career was not very commercial. In addition to her records, her songs appear on cultural radio stations. She gave special attention to live performances, in association with cultural institutions of Mexico City and some states of the republic.

Tehua died from cancer in Mexico City on 21 August 2014.

Select discography
 Añoranzas mexicanas
 Añoranzas mexicanas volumen II
 Añoranzas mexicanas volumen III
 Añoranzas mexicanas volumen IV
 Añoranzas mexicanas volumen V, with Óscar Chávez
 Añoranzas mexicanas volumen VI, with Óscar Chávez
 Añoranzas mexicanas volumen VII, interpreting Tata Nacho
 Y la canción se hizo... Historia
 La canción femenina, singing María Grever
 Tehua interpreta a Chava Flores

References

External links
 

1943 births
2014 deaths
Deaths from cancer in Mexico
People from Querétaro City
Singers from Querétaro
20th-century Mexican women singers
21st-century Mexican women singers